Guillermo Sandro Salas Suárez (born 21 October 1974) is a Peruvian football manager and former player who played as a right back. He is the current manager of Alianza Lima.

Club career
Born in Lima, Salas played seven years for Peruvian giants Alianza Lima as well as for several other clubs.

International career
Salas has made 26 appearances for the senior Peru national football team.

Personal life
Married to Irina Vera in 2002. They have a daughter, Brisa Salas Vera.

Honours

Manager
Alianza Lima
Peruvian Primera División: 2022

References

External links

1974 births
Living people
Footballers from Lima
Association football fullbacks
Peruvian footballers
Peru international footballers
2004 Copa América players
Club Alcides Vigo footballers
Deportivo Pesquero footballers
Sport Boys footballers
Club Alianza Lima footballers
Club Deportivo Universidad de San Martín de Porres players
Colegio Nacional Iquitos footballers
León de Huánuco footballers
Peruvian Primera División players
Peruvian football managers
Club Alianza Lima managers